The 2015 WAFL season was the 131st season of the various incarnations of the West Australian Football League (WAFL). Subiaco won the match by 66 points, recording their second consecutive premiership and 13th overall.

For the first time since 1994, the finals series was based on a top-5, rather than the top 4 system that has been used since 1931, with the exception of 1991–1994.

Clubs

Ladder

Finals series

Elimination and Qualifying Finals

Semi-finals

Preliminary final

Grand Final

References 

West Australian Football League seasons
WAFL